Patrick Hennessey may refer to:
 Patrick Hennessey (trade unionist)
 Patrick Hennessey (barrister)

See also
 Patrick Hennessy (disambiguation)